Jessie Kesson (28 October 1916 – 26 September 1994), born Jessie Grant McDonald, was a Scottish novelist, playwright and radio producer.

Life

She was born in a workhouse in Inverness, to a mother who had turned to prostitution after being disowned by her family, and brought up in Elgin until the age of eight. She was then taken from her mother and placed in an orphanage at Skene, Aberdeenshire. In her circumstances, she was not permitted to enter further education and had to go into domestic service.

While in domestic service she suffered a breakdown and was admitted to the Royal Cornhill Hospital in Aberdeen for a year. After leaving the hospital she spent time living with an elderly woman on a croft in Abriachan. It was there in 1934, while roaming the hills, that she met and subsequently married Johnnie Kesson, a cattleman. She and her husband were farm workers in North East Scotland from 1939 to 1951; writing from this period illustrates her abiding love of nature and immersion in the changing seasons.

Encounters with Nan Shepherd and then Neil M. Gunn opened opportunities in writing, including plays for the BBC in Aberdeen.

She moved to London in 1947, where she lived for the rest of her life. As well as domestic work, she worked as a radio producer, producing Woman's Hour and more than 100 radio plays.

In 1984 and in 1988 she was awarded honorary doctorates from the University of Dundee and the University of Aberdeen and in 2009 Scotland's Creative Writing Centre, Moniack Mhor, established the Jessie Keeson Fellowship in honour of her life and work.

Works
Her writings include The White Bird Passes (1958), filmed for BBC Television in 1980, Glitter of Mica (1963), Another Time, Another Place (1983), which became an award-winning film, and Where the Apple Ripens (1985).

As well as writing novels, she also wrote more than 100 plays for radio over 45 years.

In 2000, the first edition of Isobel Murray's authorised biography Jessie Kesson: Writing Her Life, published by Canongate Books, won the National Library of Scotland/Saltire Research Book of the Year. The second edition, published by Kennedy & Boyd in 2011, revealed the truth about Kesson's ever-absent father.

Reviews
 Donaldson, William (1980), review of The White Bird Passes, in Cencrastus No. 4, Winter 1980–81, pp. 47 & 48, 
 Anderson, Carol (1983), Shining Corn: Glittering Mica, which includes a review of Glittering Mica, in Hearn, Sheila G. (ed.), Cencrastus No. 12, Spring 1983, pp. 40 & 41,

References

Further reading
Kesson, Jessie (1984), "Writer at Work", in Parker, Geoff (ed.), Cencrastus No. 19, Winter 1984, pp. 23 & 24, 
Murray, Isobel (ed.) (1996), ''Scottish Writers Talking 1</i>, Tuckwell Press,

External links
 National Library of Scotland Modern Scottish Writers
 IMDB entry for Another Time, Another Place

1916 births
1994 deaths
20th-century British dramatists and playwrights
20th-century British novelists
20th-century British women writers
20th-century British writers
20th-century Scottish women writers
20th-century Scottish writers
British women dramatists and playwrights
Proletarian literature
Scottish dramatists and playwrights
Scottish radio producers
Scottish Renaissance
Scottish women novelists
Women radio producers